The Bahraini Premier League is the main football competition in the Kingdom of Bahrain. Currently known as the Nasser bin Hamad Premier League, the first season was held in 1957. The winners of the domestic championship qualify for the AFC Cup. The championship is currently contested by 12 clubs.

Structure

Current structure
12 clubs currently play a two round robin set of fixtures totaling 22 games in order to determine the league champions. Although games are played on a home and away basis, almost all games are played at the National Stadium.

The eleventh and twelfth-placed clubs are relegated with the ninth and tenth enter the relegation play-offs.

Previous structures
In earlier seasons, the league has been radically overhauled to feature all the professional clubs of Bahrain. Instances being the 2008–09 and 2002 league seasons. The leagues featuring up to 19 teams would play each other on one occasion with the top 10 teams staying in the Premier League top flight and the bottom sides (from 11 to 19) forming the next seasons 2nd division.

Between the seasons of 2002 and 2009, the top four sides of the league would also play in the Crown Prince Cup.

Clubs (2022–23)
 Al-Ahli
 Al-Hala
 Al-Hidd
 Al-Khaldiya
 Al-Muharraq
 Al-Riffa
 Al-Shabab
 Bahrain SC
 Budaiya
 East Riffa
 Manama
 Sitra

2022–23 Clubs' stadiums

Team re-structuring
In 2002, a host of clubs were amalgamated:

 Bahrain is an amalgamation of Bahrain and Al-Khaleej.
 Riffa is an amalgamation of West Riffa and Zallaq.
 Al-Najma is an amalgamation of Al-Hilal, Al-Qadisiya and Ras Al-Rumman.
 Al-Sahel is an amalgamation of Qalali and Hadd.
 Al-Tadamun is an amalgamation of Boori, Karazkan, Hamla, Reef Union and Damastan.
 Al-Shabab is an amalgamation of Deyya, Sanabis, Jadd Hafs, Naeem, Karrana, Sahla and Karbabad.
 Al-Ittifaq is an amalgamation of Al-Arabi, Maqaba and Bani Jumra.

List of champions
Champions are:

 1956–57 : Al-Muharraq
 1957–58 : Al-Muharraq
 1958–59 : Al-Nasr
 1959–60 : Al-Muharraq
 1960–61 : Al-Muharraq
 1961–62 : Al-Muharraq
 1962–63 : Al-Muharraq
 1963–64 : Al-Muharraq
 1964–65 : Al-Muharraq
 1965–66 : Al-Muharraq
 1966–67 : Al-Muharraq
 1967–68 : Bahrain (Muharraq)
 1968–69 : Al-Ahli (Manama)
 1969–70 : Al-Muharraq
 1970–71 : Al-Muharraq
 1971–72 : Al-Ahli (Manama)
 1972–73 : Al-Muharraq
 1973–74 : Al-Muharraq
 1974–75 : Al-Arabi (Al-Najma now)
 1975–76 : Al-Muharraq
 1976–77 : Al-Ahli (Manama)
 1977–78 : Bahrain (Muharraq)
 1978–79 : Al Hala
 1979–80 : Al-Muharraq
 1980–81 : Bahrain (Muharraq)
 1981–82 : West Riffa
 1982–83 : Al-Muharraq
 1983–84 : Al-Muharraq
 1984–85 : Bahrain (Muharraq)
 1985–86 : Al-Muharraq
 1986–87 : West Riffa
 1987–88 : Al-Muharraq
 1988–89 : Bahrain (Muharraq)
 1989–90 : West Riffa
 1990–91 : Al-Muharraq
 1991–92 : Al-Muharraq
 1992–93 : West Riffa
 1993–94 : East Riffa
 1994–95 : Al-Muharraq
 1995–96 : Al-Ahli (Manama)
 1996–97 : West Riffa
 1997–98 : West Riffa
 1998–99 : Al-Muharraq
 1999–00 : West Riffa
 2000–01 : Al-Muharraq
 2002 : Al-Muharraq
 2002–03 : Al-Riffa
 2003–04 : Al-Muharraq
 2004–05 : Al-Riffa
 2005–06 : Al-Muharraq
 2006–07 : Al-Muharraq
 2007–08 : Al-Muharraq
 2008–09 : Al-Muharraq
 2009–10 : Al-Ahli (Manama)
 2010–11 : Al-Muharraq
 2011–12 : Al-Riffa
 2012–13 : Busaiteen
 2013–14 : Al-Riffa
 2014–15 : Al-Muharraq
 2015–16 : Al-Hidd
 2016–17 : Malkiya
 2017–18 : Al-Muharraq
 2018–19 : Al-Riffa
 2019–20 : Al-Hidd
 2020–21 : Al-Riffa
 2021–22 : Al-Riffa

Total championships
The number of national championships that clubs in Bahrain have attained.

Top scorers

References

External links
 Bahrain Premiere League  (Arabic)
 goalzz.com - Bahraini Premiere League
 Soccerway - Bahrain Premier League
 Weltfussballarchiv - Bahraini Premier League 
 Bahrain Premier League - Hailoosport.com (Arabic)
 Bahrain Premier League - Hailoosport.com

 
Football competitions in Bahrain
Top level football leagues in Asia
Sports leagues established in 1956